Feteh Saad Mgeni is a Tanzanian CCM politician and Member of Parliament for Bumbwini constituency in the National Assembly of Tanzania since 2005.

References

Living people
Chama Cha Mapinduzi MPs
Tanzanian MPs 2010–2015
Year of birth missing (living people)